Bakkeveen is a village in the municipality of Opsterland in eastern Friesland (Fryslân) in the Netherlands. It had a population of around 1,465 in January 2017.

History 
The village was first mentioned in 1232-1233 as "apud Backenvene", and means "raised bog of Bakke (person)". Bakkeveen developed in the 13th century around the outpost Mariënhof of monastery  in Hallum. 

In 1685, the Bakkeveense vaart was dug by the Drachtster Company to exploit the peat in the region. From 1732 onwards, the houses were moved to the canal by order of Jonkheer Tjaerd van Aylva. A church was planned and even model had been made, however it was never build.

Bakkeveen was home to 453 people in 1840. The Dutch Reformed church was finally built in 1856 in neoclassic style. The  was a farm built in 1818. In 1922, it was transformed into an estate by Baron . The estate has a  forest. The estate was purchased by Vereniging Natuurmonumenten in 1997. 

In the late-20th century, the forests and heaths attracted recreational tourism to Bakkeveen.

Notable people 
 Folkert Idsinga (born 1971), lawyer and politician
 Eddy Schurer (born 1964), former racing cyclist
 Riemer van der Velde (born 1940), football functionary, former chairman of SC Heerenveen

Gallery

References

External links

Populated places in Friesland
Geography of Opsterland